Carolina Hurga Mussi (born August 7, 1988 in São Paulo, São Paulo, Brazil), is a Brazilian competitive swimmer.

She joined the national delegation that participated in the 2009 World Aquatics Championships in Rome, where she competed in the 4×100-metre medley, along with Fabíola Molina, Gabriella Silva and Tatiana Lemos team that finished eighth in the final.  In the playoffs they beat the South American record, doing 3:58.49.  Before World Championship, Carolina broke the South American record of the 200-metre breaststroke at Maria Lenk Trophy. In this World Championship, was also in 25th in the 100-metre breaststroke and was disqualified from the 200-metre breaststroke

She was at the 2010 Pan Pacific Swimming Championships in Irvine, where she finished 22nd in the 50-metre breaststroke, 20th in the 100-metre breaststroke  and 23rd the 200-metre breaststroke.

Attending the 2010 South American Games, won the gold medal in the 200-metre breaststroke, and bronze in the 100-metre breaststroke.

At the 2011 World Aquatics Championships in Shanghai, she earned the 36th position in the 100-metre breaststroke and 17th in the 4×100-metre medley.

In the 2011 Pan American Games in Guadalajara, Carolina was in 14th place in the 100-metre breaststroke.

References

1988 births
Living people
Swimmers from São Paulo
Brazilian female breaststroke swimmers
Swimmers at the 2011 Pan American Games
South American Games gold medalists for Brazil
South American Games bronze medalists for Brazil
South American Games medalists in swimming
Competitors at the 2010 South American Games
Pan American Games competitors for Brazil
20th-century Brazilian women
21st-century Brazilian women